Sam Lewis (February 5, 1912 - February 18, 1992) was an American pilot who flew transport aircraft as a foreign volunteer in Israel's struggle for Independence and as chief pilot for Israel's national airline, El Al. Lewis was known for his ability to fly any airplane under any condition.

Early life 

Sam Lewis was born Samuel Rifkin on February 5, 1912, in Manhattan in New York City, New York. He was the second child of Louis Rifkin, a furrier, and Anna Rifkin, an amateur Yiddish actress and poet, who immigrated to the US from Mogilev, Russia (now Belarus) in 1910.

In 1925, when Lewis was 13, he accompanied his uncle, Rabbi Gershon Epstein, on a trip to Los Angeles, California, to consider joining the Rabbi's old congregation members who moved there from Russia where he had been their rabbi. Since the uncle only spoke Yiddish, Lewis joined him as his English translator. Lewis was supposed to return to New York by train after leaving his uncle in Los Angeles, but after seeing the wide green open spaces there, he refused to return to the cemented streets of New York. When his parents came to get him, they, too, fell in love with the place and decided to stay. The family settled in the Boyle Heights neighborhood in Los Angeles.

Though Sam grew up helping his father in his fur shop, he had other interests. He was athletic and an amateur boxer, and he loved anything to do with airplanes from an early age. While in high school, Lewis used to go to Clover Field, now Santa Monica Airport, finding different jobs in exchange for an air ride.

In 1935, when Lewis was 22, he had his first solo flight after only four flying lessons. Right after that, he joined the Jewish Flying Club (later the California Flying Club) in Los Angeles, where the members rented airplanes over the weekends and enjoyed flying.

Early aviation career 

After accumulating 200 hours of flying, Lewis became a certified flying instructor. In 1937, he left his father's fur shop to work as a flying instructor. He worked for Morton Air Services and then Pacific Air College, both at Mines Field (now LAX) in Los Angeles.

In 1939, as the war was brewing in Europe, Cal Aero, which had a military contract, hired Lewis. This job there was to train flight instructors to teach cadets how to fly aerobatics for combat maneuvers, first at Glendale Airport and then (the future) Ontario Airport in California. He was a Flight Commander and later became a Chief Flight Instructor.

In December 1941, after the attack on Pearl Harbor, Lewis left his job, wanting to join the war effort as a pilot of a multi-engine aircraft rather than being an instructor. Lewis, together with five other flight commanders from Cal Aero, went to Montreal and joined the Royal Air Force Ferry Command. In Early 1942, Lewis started ferrying big airplanes such as Lockheed Lodestar, Hudson Bombers, and Flying Boats from Montreal, Canada to the UK RAF airbase in Prestwick, Scotland.

Following a few months of flying for the RAF Ferry Command, Lewis joined Western Airlines, flying between Los Angeles, CA and Salt Lake City, UT. When the promise to become a captain of DC-3s after three months from hiring never materialized, Lewis confronted the president of Western and learned that the latter had an objection to the idea of having a Jewish captain flying his airplanes.

Immediately after this talk Lewis left Western Airlines and joined TWA in Washington, D.C., as a captain. During the war, TWA had a contract with the Air Force - Contract Carrier Twelve, and Lewis joined the Air Transport Command (ATC) - flying cargo for the military, first in B-24 and then advanced to Boeing 307 - the Stratoliner. He estimated that he did more than 100 ocean crossings for the Air Force through TWA to Europe, South Africa, South America, and Asia.

Over the years, Lewis, who was then called Rifkin, encountered countless antisemitic comments, the one made by the president of Western Airline was only one of them. While flying for TWA wearing a uniform during the war, Lewis stopped in Santa Maria in the Azores, where the station manager called him “a Jew Bastard.” Lewis, who was an amateur boxer, punched him in reply. After this incident, a chief pilot friend warned him that another such incident would end his career. He suggested that Lewis change his Jewish last name to attract less antisemitic comments. In 1944, Lewis chose to use the name of his recently deceased father - Louis - with a different spelling as his new surname.

Israeli aviation career 

In 1947, Al Schwimmer, a former TWA flight engineer, recruited Lewis and other pilots to Machal for Operation Zebra. The team smuggled weapons through Czechoslovakia to help Israel during its War of Independence and participated in aerial attacks against the fighting Arabs.  Their actions violated the American arms embargo on Palestine and the Middle East, and in 1949, Lewis and his friends returned to the US to face their trial. Their exploits during Operation Zebra were documented in the 2015 film A Wing and a Prayer.

In 1949, Lewis became the first Chief Pilot of EL AL, the Israeli airline. He worked there until his mandatory retirement at the age of 60, in 1972.

In late 1948 the Israeli government with the help of the JDC, an American Jewish relief organization, hired Alaska Airlines to airlift Jewish refugees from Yemen to Israel. In early 1949, Lewis took a leave of absence from his job in EL AL to join Alaska Airlines to take part in this airlift, which was later recognized as Operation Magic Carpet or On the Wings of Eagles. The airlift from Yemen came to completion in September 1950, after airlifting to Israel 49,000 Yemeni Jews.  

After his mandatory retirement as an EL AL pilot at the age of 60, Lewis, who was not ready yet to give up flying, joined his friend Al Schwimmer at the Israeli Aircraft Industry (IAI). He worked there as a pilot and consultant and helped to set up several airlines in Europe, Asia, and South America. He remained with IAI until 1980.

Trial 

In late 1948, Lewis and his nine American friends in Operation Zebra learned that their actions incurred US charges that they violated the American arms embargo on Palestine and the Middle East. In 1949 Lewis and his friends returned to the US to face their trial. The trials of Lewis and some of the members of Operation Zebra took place in Los Angeles, having the Jewish Agency provide them with legal services. The trial ended in early 1950. Lewis was the only defendant found not guilty, due to one juror insisting Lewis was just a hired pilot, not a conspirator. The rest received $10,000 fines, which the Jewish Agency paid, and only one – Charlie Winters, who was not Jewish – whose trial took place in New York, was sentenced to eighteen-month in prison.  All the convicts in the Operation Zebra trial were eventually pardoned by various US presidents.

Personal life 

On May 5, 1931, when he was 19, Lewis married his high school sweetheart and next-door neighbor Jenny (Jean) Kopf. In 1933, the couple welcomed their first-born daughter Sandra (Brown), and later, in 1941, they had their second daughter Elaine (Aronoff). They lived in Los Angeles, New York, and Washington, DC, during WWII.  When Sam was able to join El Al after the trial, they began their life in Israel in 1950 and lived a few years in London. Upon Lewis’ retirement from IAI, the couple moved back to Los Angeles in 1982 and remained there until their deaths. On February 18, 1992, Lewis died in Los Angeles, California, of an accidental gunshot wound.

In popular culture 

Lewis acted as an informal consultant to the movie Cast a Giant Shadow (1966), depicting the events of Israel's War of Independence in 1948.

The exploits of Lewis and his Machal friends during Israel's War of Independence were documented in the movies:
 They Were All We Had (1988) by Jonathan Paz 
 A Wing and a Prayer (2015) by Boaz Dvir,

And the books 
 The Secret Battle for Israel (1966) by Benjamin Kagan
 The Pledge (1970) by Leonard Slater
 The Secret Army (1984) by David J. Bercuson
 El Al Star in the Sky (1990) by Marvin G. Goldman
 Angels in the Sky (2017) by Robert Gandt
 Saving Israel (2020) by Boaz Dvir

References

External links 
 The Jewish James Bond and Other Heroes, January 1, 2021, on YouTube

1912 births
1992 deaths
Deaths by firearm in California
American expatriates in Israel
United States Army Air Forces pilots of World War II
American people of Belarusian-Jewish descent
Aviators from New York (state)
American expatriates in the United Kingdom
People from Manhattan
Aviators from Washington, D.C.
People from Los Angeles